Dange Shuni is a Local Government Area in Sokoto State, Nigeria. Its headquarters are in the town of Dange.

It has an area of 1,210 km and a population of 194,546 at the 2006 census.

The postal code of the area is 852.

References

Local Government Areas in Sokoto State